Machuca Tile Inc., originally called Mosaicos Machuca, is the oldest tile manufacturing business in the Philippines, dating back to the early 1900s. Baldozas mosaicos was the proper term describing the Mediterranean cement tiles, more popular at present as Machuca tiles, named after Don Pepe, son of the premier producer of baldozas mosaicos in the Philippines, Don Jose Machuca y Romero.

History

Don Jose Machuca y Romero was the primary producer of Mediterranean tiles in the Philippines during the early 1900s. His son, Don Pepe, who was an Audencia, established Mosaicos Machuca at an ancestral house in Calle Tanduay in San Miguel, Manila while the tile factory was located beside the Pasig River. They pioneered wet and dry processes of making Mediterranean-designed cement tiles in the Philippines.

Machuca Tiles Inc. is now managed by Arch. Luis P. Machuca Jr., a fourth generation member of the Machuca family.

Location

In 1993, the showroom of Machuca Tile Inc. was transferred to its present location at the ground floor of J y J Condominium, #867 General Solano Street, San Miguel, Manila. On the other hand, their factory was located at Lot 17 Marian Park, Road I, East Service Road, South Superhighway, Parañaque.

Machuca Tiles

Machuca Tiles Inc. uses a traditional method  of making tiles without baking. They also use Lansco powder from Spain, to achieve a traditional earth tone palette. The tiles' rustic look is characterized by intricate border motifs and muted colors with hand-brushed quality and sophisticated palettes.

The standard size of the tiles was 8 in. by 8 in. (200 mm by 200 mm).

Tiles could be designed two ways:
 Continuous ribbon-like (bands)
 Enclosed spaces (panels) 
 Unlimited flat patterns

Projects

Religious and Institutional
 San Vicente de Paul by Andres Luna de San Pedro
 San Sebastian Church Sacristy
 San Beda Church
 Colegio San Agustin

Commercial
 Alabang Town Center
 Shangri-La Mactan Island Resort
 Cabalen Chain of Restaurants
 Hacienda Luisita
 Jai Alai
 Gingersnaps stores
 O Banh mi Vietnamese Sandwich Restaurant (Gateway Cubao)
 The Pavilion Restaurant, Alegre Beach Resort, Cebu - a joint project of Architect Augusto Villalon and Interior designer Josephine Labrador Hermano

Residential
 Atelier of Patis Tesoro
 Ancestral residence of former President Jose Laurel
 Residence of former Cultural Center of the Philippines Artistic Director, Nicanor Tiongson
 Residence of Lulu Tan Gan, a fashion designer

References

Manufacturing companies of the Philippines
Companies based in Manila